Daniel Morys (born 26 December 2000) is a Polish professional footballer who plays as either a right-back or a right winger for III liga club Stal Brzeg, on loan from Resovia.

Club career
On 19 September 2020, he signed a one-season contract with Garbarnia Kraków.

References

External links

2000 births
Footballers from Kraków
Living people
Polish footballers
Association football midfielders
Wisła Kraków players
Olimpia Elbląg players
Garbarnia Kraków players
Resovia (football) players
Ekstraklasa players
I liga players
II liga players